The Ogooué-Leketi National Park is a national park in the Republic of the Congo, established on 9 November 2018.  This site has an area of 3,500 km on the border with Gabon's Batéké Plateau National Park.

History
Since 2004, the Wildlife Conservation Society (WCS) and the Ministry of Forestry Economy have carried out detailed biological and socio-economic surveys in and around the proposed Ogooué-Leketi National Park (OLNP), to evaluate the conservation potential of this area, and to define the appropriate boundaries and benefits of the new protected area. Following the closure of the three logging concessions that overlapped the proposed protected area, Ogooué-Leketi has officially been declared Congo's fifth National Park.

Geography and Flora
The OLNP lies in a unique landscape, dominated by vast rolling savannahs in the east, with green ribbons of gallery forest linking up to a larger rainforest block to the north and west. Within this forest is a constellation of swampy, mineral-rich forest clearings that offer unique opportunities to view forest wildlife.
It contains the headwaters of both the Ogooué River, the main river of Gabon and the Leketi river, which feeds the Alima and eventually the Congo river.

Fauna
The park is home to forest  gorillas, chimpanzees, forest  elephants, forest buffalo, red river hog, several species of monkey including the mandrill, and other threatened species such as Grimm's (or bush) duiker, side-striped jackal, three species of bustard, Congo Moorchat (Traquet-fourmilier du Congo), Brazza's Martin (Hirondelle de Brazza), and a probable new species of cisticola.

References 

National parks of the Republic of the Congo
Protected areas established in 2006